Palomar may refer to:

Places
 Any of several locations in San Diego County, California:
 Palomar Mountain
 Palomar Observatory, located on Palomar Mountain
 Palomar College in San Marcos, California
 Palomar Medical Center in Escondido, California
 Palomar Airport, officially McClellan-Palomar Airport, in Carlsbad, California
 El Palomar, Buenos Aires, a city in Argentina
 El Palomar (airbase), Argentina
 El Palomar, Valencia, a municipality in Spain
 Palomar de Arroyos, a town in Aragón, Spain

Music
 Palomar (band), a band from Brooklyn, New York
 Palomar, a band formed by three members of Paw
 "Palomar", a 1992 song by the Rheostatics from Whale Music

Other uses
 Palomar (comics), a 2003 graphic novel by Gilbert Hernandez
 Palomar Ballroom, in Los Angeles, California
 Palomar Handicap, a horse race
 Palomar knot
 Palomar Pictures, a subsidiary of ABC Pictures

People with the surname
 Arnau de Palomar (fl. c. 1150), Catalan nobleman
 Enrique de la Mora y Palomar (1907–1978), Mexican architect
 Jared Palomar, member of Augustana

See also
 Hotel Palomar (Washington, D.C.)
 Mr. Palomar, a 1983 novel by Italo Calvino 
 Palomares (disambiguation)
 Palomar Sky Survey
 Palomar Transient Factory, an astronomical wide-field survey
 Palomar Testbed Interferometer at Palomar Observatory
 Planet-Crossing Asteroid Survey, initiated in 1973
 Señor Palomar, a character in Lego Adventurers theme